Marina Lesko, also known as M. Lesko  is a Russian journalist, author, and cultural commentator.

Career
Lesko started her career at the Novy Vzglyad in 1992. She later left and started working at the Travel + Leisure (Russian Edition). She ran that magazine for a while. In 2006, Lesko became head editor of the Moulin Rouge monthly, a position that she retained until 2009, when she became VP of Novy Vzglyad.

She is a regular contributor to Moskovskaya Pravda. Before joining Moulin Rouge, Lesko wrote Kompanja column. And before accepting her role as a columnist, Lesko was a television critic, and also served as a features writer.

She is best known for her participation  in the Eurasian Media Forum debate segments, regarding so called media-glamorization.

Positions

Columns by Lesko in Russian
About Russian TV in Profil/Der Spiegel
Who is who?
Regarding SL (Second Life)
Women Fortune
Women & Politics
Money
Russian Writers
What is wife?

See also

 Yevgenia Albats
 Vladislav Listyev
 Dodolev
 Artyom Borovik
 Sergey Dorenko
 Alexander Nevzorov
 Moskovskaya Komsomolka
 Moskovskaya Pravda

References

External links
  Publishing House

Russian journalists
Russian writers
Russian newspaper editors
Living people
Russian women writers
Women newspaper editors
Year of birth missing (living people)